The Mixed team normal hill competition at the FIS Nordic World Ski Championships 2019 was held on 2 March 2019.

Results
The first round was started at 16:00 and the final round at 17:10.

References

Mixed team normal hill